Etazhna sobstvenost (Bulgarian: Етажна собственост) (English: Condominium) is a Bulgarian sitcom produced by Nova television (Bulgaria). Producer of the series is Krasimir Vankov. Directors of the series are Julian Minkov and Todor Nikolov and writers - Ivan Angelov, Stefan Stoyanov, Zlatina Nestorova and Sylvia Tsonkova. Operators are Kutsarov Stefan and Alex Samoungi. Film installation is Georgi Yordanov and Elena Seymenova.

History 
Etazhna sobstvenost in Bulgarian means "condominium" and Season 1 was released in 2011. The action takes place in Sofia (Nadezhda Borough).

The series was filmed block of flats, not a studio. The characters live in an old, Panelák building. They were trying to face the negative side of the Bulgarian national psychology and other household problems-poverty, lack of money and annoying relatives (and neighbours).

Since Season 3, the action was developing in a new building, because the old one was ruined. It was due to the fault of Tsekov (a contractor).

Actors 
  
Anton Radichev - Edelweiss Dzhambazov; young retiree, went on a mission in Cambodia living in blocks
Nadya Savova - grandmother Tsetsa Drambozova; Velichko's mother, mother-in-law of Mimi, landlady of Geri beloved grandfather Stefcho, gossip
Yavor Gigov - Velichko Drambozov; Tsetsa's son, husband of Mimi, house manager of the unit tester products
Militza Gladnishka - Mimi Drambozova; Velichko's wife, daughter grandmother Tsetsa, former shot-out player
Milena Markova - Geri; tenant of grandmother Tsetsa, owner of the salon in the block
Nevena Bozukova - Temenuga Balabanova; Geri's roommate (season 1), wife of Zhoro (season 2) works in the salon
Stanimir Gumov - Zhivko Zdravkov; Owner of Funeral bloc

Seasons

References

Bulgarian television series
2010s Bulgarian television series
2013 Bulgarian television series endings
2011 Bulgarian television series debuts
Nova (Bulgarian TV channel) original programming